Liolaemus flavipiceus is a species of lizard in the family  Liolaemidae. It is native to Argentina and Chile.

References

flavipiceus
Reptiles described in 2003
Reptiles of Argentina
Reptiles of Chile
Taxa named by José Miguel Alfredo María Cei